The Country Doctor is a 1936 American drama film directed by Henry King and written by Sonya Levien. The film stars Jean Hersholt, June Lang, Slim Summerville, Michael Whalen, Dorothy Peterson and Robert Barrat. The Country Doctor was released on March 12, 1936, by 20th Century Fox.

Plot
The Country Doctor is set in a remote area of Quebec, Canada. The country doctor John Luke (Jean Hersholt) is an unlicensed general practitioner who cares for the residents of a small Canadian timber station taking much of his payment in barter. Having spent years operating from the station and from his own dwelling, and following a particularly bad epidemic of diphtheria in which several children die, the doctor decides to travel to Montreal to speak with the medical Managing Director of the region. The doctor's hope is that the director will try to get the rich corporation who owns the land to pay for a proper hospital.

After trying unsuccessfully to make any headway and finding himself stymied by governmental red tape, he crashes a public dinner given by the medical association to argue his point in person. The timber corporation hears of this protest and sends their lawyers to take revenge on the doctor. During the course of the investigation the doctor's lack of a license is quickly discovered and the local police are informed that the doctor has been practicing illegally. The doctor returns to the timber station in low spirits.

Before long, Asa Wyatt (John Qualen), one of the workers comes to the doctor's house with his pregnant wife (Aileen Carlyle). She is just about to give birth and the worker begs the doctor to help them despite his lack of a license.

The local constabulary become involved and warn the doctor that he could face charges if he delivers the baby, but the doctor finds that he can't simply stand by passively and he starts to help the mother as the police berate him. After delivering the child, the doctor realizes that the birth is actually a multiple birth and the delivery continues until the doctor has delivered five babies.

When word gets out, the doctor becomes a national hero, the building of a local hospital is set in motion, and the medical Managing Director in Montreal is congratulated by the Governor-General.

Cast 

 The Dionne Quintuplets as The Wyatt Quintuplets
 Yvonne Dionne as Yvonne 
 Cecile Dionne as Cécile 
 Marie Dionne as Marie 
 Annette Dionne as Annette 
 Emilie Dionne as Émelie
 Jean Hersholt as Dr. John Luke
 June Lang as Mary MacKenzie
 Slim Summerville as Constable Jim Ogden
 Michael Whalen as Tony Luke
 Dorothy Peterson as Nurse Katherine Kennedy
 Robert Barrat as MacKenzie
 Jane Darwell as Mrs. Graham
 John Qualen as Asa Wyatt
 Frank Reicher as Dr. Paul Luke
 Montagu Love as Sir Basil Crawford
 David Torrence as Governor General
 George Chandler as Greasy
 Helen Jerome Eddy as Mrs. Ogden
 Aileen Carlyle as Mrs. Wyatt
 George Meeker as Dr. Wilson
 J. Anthony Hughes as Mike
 William "Billy" Benedict as The Gawker
 Claude King as Toastmaster
 Richard Carlyle (uncredited)

Production
In The Country Doctor (1936), a movie starring the quints, Jean Hersholt portrayed Dr. John Luke, a character based on Dr. Allan Roy Dafoe. There were two sequels: Reunion (1936) and Five of a Kind (1938).

Reception
Film reviewer Frank Nugent in his review of The Country Doctor for The New York Times described the "fell-good" film: "We were prepared to disapprove of the quintuplets as a matter of policy, but there is no holding out against "The Country Doctor" at the Music Hall, in which they are making their first screen appearance—not counting the newsreels. An irresistibly appealing blend of sentiment and comedy, the Twentieth Century-Fox picture justifies even that anonymous advertising genius who described the advent of the Dionne babies as the greatest event since "The Birth of a Nation".

Writing for The Spectator in 1936, Graham Greene gave the film a good review, describing it as "an honest film" and "admirably genuine". Greene praised Hersholt for "one of the most sympathetic performances [he had] seen this year", and noted that although those judging the film from the austerest angle might find the comic aspects of the film to be "not in the best taste", he himself found sequences like the delivery of quintuplets to have been "extraordinarily funny".

References

Notes

Citations

Bibliography

 Halliwell, Leslie. Leslie Halliwell's Film Guide. New York: Harper & Roe, 1989. .
 Solomon, Aubrey. Twentieth Century-Fox: A Corporate and Financial History. Lanham, Maryland: Rowman & Littlefield, 2002. .

External links 
 

1936 films
1930s English-language films
American drama films
1936 drama films
20th Century Fox films
Films directed by Henry King
American black-and-white films
1930s American films